Amor Sin Fronteras is a 1992 telenovela produced by Venezuelan television network Venevisión. Luly Bossa and Mariano Álvarez starred as the main protagonists. The telenovela was written by José Manuel Peláez and lasted 96 episodes.

Plot
Amor sin Fronteras is the story of Victoria Mayo, a beautiful woman who is the heiress to the Victoria Corporation. Her husband Carlos Ruiz starts becoming distant towards her due to her ever-increasing jealousy. This situation leads Carlos to meet Natalia Arenales, a woman he later falls in love with. His relationship with Natalia makes him forget that he is married. This leads to a series of confrontations that later lead to the mysterious disappearance of Victoria. But Victoria much alive and will use a woman named Teresa Rios help her get revenge against her husband.

Cast
Luly Bossa as Victoria Mayo
Mariano Álvarez as Carlos Ruiz
Lucy Mendoza
Rosita Alonso
Lourdes Colon

References

External links
Amor sin fronteras at the Internet Movie Database

1992 telenovelas
Venevisión telenovelas
Venezuelan telenovelas
1992 Venezuelan television series debuts